Saxparty 3 is a 1976 Ingmar Nordströms studio album. In 1988, it was rereleased to CD.

Track listing
 Sommarmorgon
 The Elephant Song
 Rock On
 Blue Hawaii
 A La Bonne Heure
 I Can't Stop Lovin' You
 Banana Boat Song (Day-O)
 How High the Moon
 Indian Summer (Africa)
 Livet är härligt att leva
 O Sole Mio
 Lite närhet
 Volare
 In the Mood

Charts

References 

1976 albums
Ingmar Nordströms albums